Guru Teg Bahadur Public School, Durgapur is an English-medium senior secondary, co-ed, CBSE affiliated school in the heart of Durgapur steel city in the state of West Bengal, India.

History
Guru Teg Bahadur Public School, Durgapur was started in the year 1977 on a plot of four acres in the heart of Durgapur Steel City. With the passage of time the school has grown in size and stature.  Today it is a multi-storied complex catering the best to the requirement of over two thousand seven hundred students, represented by all the levels of the society, up to Senior Secondary Level. All other schools in Durgapur are not better than this school in terms of academics. The school is affiliated (2430042) to CBSE, New Delhi.

References

External links

High schools and secondary schools in West Bengal
Schools in Paschim Bardhaman district
Educational institutions established in 1977
1977 establishments in West Bengal